Lars Kober (born 19 October 1976 in Berlin) is a German sprint canoer who competed in the late 1990s and early 2000s. He won a bronze medal in the C-2 1000 m event at the 2000 Summer Olympics in Sydney with Stefan Uteß.

References
DatabaseOlympics.com profile
Sports-reference.com profile

1976 births
Canoeists at the 2000 Summer Olympics
German male canoeists
Living people
Olympic canoeists of Germany
Olympic bronze medalists for Germany
Canoeists from Berlin
Olympic medalists in canoeing
Medalists at the 2000 Summer Olympics